The Gryazev-Shipunov GSh-6-23 (GRAU designation: 9A-620 for GSh-6-23, 9A-768 for GSh-6-23M modernized variant) is a six-barreled 23 mm rotary cannon used by some modern Soviet/Russian military aircraft.

The GSh-6-23 differs from most American multi-barreled aircraft cannon in that it is gas-operated, rather than externally powered via an electric, hydraulic, or pneumatic system.

The GSh-6-23 uses the 23×115 Russian AM-23 round, fed via linked cartridge belt or a linkless feed system. The linkless system, adopted after numerous problems and failures with the belt feed, is limited. Fire control is electrical, using a 27 V DC system. The cannon has 10 pyrotechnic cocking charges, similar to those used in European gas-operated revolver cannon such as the DEFA 554 or Mauser BK-27.

The rapid rate of fire exhausts ammunition quickly: the Mikoyan MiG-31 aircraft, for example, with 260 rounds of ammunition (800 rounds maximum), would empty its ammunition tank in less than two seconds.

GSh-6-23M has the highest rate of fire out of any autocannon so far.

The GSh-6-23 is used by the Sukhoi Su-24 attack aircraft, the MiG-31 interceptor aircraft, and the now-obsolete Sukhoi Su-15 among others. However, after two Su-24s were lost because of premature shell detonation in 1983, and because of some other problems with gun usage (such as system failures), usage of the GSh-6-23 was stopped by a decision of the Soviet Air Force Command. At present all aircraft in the Russian Air Force are flying with fully operational guns.

It is also used in the SPPU-6 gun pod, which can traverse to −45° elevation, and ±45° azimuth.

Variants
 Gryazev-Shipunov GSh-6-23M; a modernized version.

See also
 GAU-8 Avenger
  Glagolev-Shipunov-Gryazev GShG-7.62
 Gryazev-Shipunov GSh-23
 Gryazev-Shipunov GSh-6-30
 M61 Vulcan
 M134 Minigun
 List of Russian weaponry

References

Sources
 Rapid Fire, Anthony G. Williams, Airlife UK, August 2000

External links
 KPB Tula (designer/manufacturer)
 Izhmash (Archive copy of manufacturer's page, in Russian)

Artillery of Russia
Rotary cannon
Multi-barrel machine guns
Aircraft guns
Aircraft guns of the Soviet Union
23 mm artillery
Multiple-barrel firearms
KBP Instrument Design Bureau products
Military equipment introduced in the 1970s